Titris Hoyuk (also Titriş Höyük) is an ancient Near East archaeological site in Turkey. It lies 45 kilometers north of Şanlıurfa, near the Euphrates river valley. It is a two period site from the 3rd millennium BC. Unlike most archaeological sites in the region the primary focus has been on excavating non-elite, mostly domestic, areas rather than elite spaces. A manna (duck) weight inscribed with the name of an official of Akkadian ruler Shu-durul was recovered from a looted context. It has been suggested that the city name was Dulu in the 3rd millennium BC.

History

The main mound, 3.3 hectares in area and rising 30 meters above the plane, was occupied from the Chalcolithic through the Islamic periods (including the Hellenistic, Roman, and Medieval periods) and has not yet been excavated. The site was active in two periods. In the first, between 2700 and 2400 BC, it reached a size of 43 hectares developing in an unplanned manner from the center. This was a time when other northern Mesopotamian sites also experienced significant growth including Tell Brak and Tell Mardikh. There were production areas for Canaanean blades on the outskirts. After a period of abandonment the second occupation period began around 2300 BC, reaching 35 hectares. This phase of development was centrally planned with regular streets and terraces. It also gained a 3 meter wide mud brick (with stone foundations) fortification wall complete with a moat. This phase ended by the close of the 3rd millennium BC. A group burial at the end of this phase has been interpreted as the result of a massacre or possibly the result of a battle. In the following several centuries pit graves were cut into the abandoned buildings.

Archaeology

Work was restricted to two non-elite areas, one in the Lower Town (east of the main mound) and one in the Outer Town (north of the main mound). Over 16 hectares of the site were subjected to a magnetometry survey. Nine seasons of excavation were conducted directed by Guillermo Algaze.

See also
Cities of the ancient Near East

References

Further reading
 Honca D, Algaze G. 1998. "Preliminary report on the human skeletal remains at Titris ̧ Höyük:1991–1996 seasons." Anatolica 24: 101–141
  Matney, Timothy, et al. "Understanding Early Bronze Age social structure through mortuary remains: A pilot aDNA study from Titriş Höyük, southeastern Turkey." International Journal of Osteoarchaeology 22.3 (2012): 338-351
 Hald, Mette Marie. "Distribution of Crops at Late Early Bronze Age Titriş Höyük, Southeast Anatolia: Towards a Model for the Identification of Consumers of Centrally Organised Food Distribution." Vegetation History and Archaeobotany, vol. 19, no. 1, 2010, pp. 69–77
  Timothy Matney. "Infant Burial Practices as Domestic Funerary Ritual at Early Bronze Age Titriş Höyük." Near Eastern Archaeology, vol. 81, no. 3, 2018, pp. 174–81
 Laneri, Nicola. "The Discovery of a Funerary Ritual: Inanna/Ishtar and Her Descent to the Nether World in Titriş Höyük, Turkey." East and West, vol. 52, no. 1/4, 2002, pp. 9–51

External links
Evidence of Early Bronze Age Massacre Found in Turkey - IBT - Sanskrity Sinha  - 02/25/12

Archaeological sites in Turkey